The 2022 Rugby Africa Women's Cup is the second edition of the Rugby Africa Women's Cup following the cancellation of the 2020 and 2021 editions due to COVID-19 related restrictions. The 12 teams are split in 4 pools that play a single round-robin where the winners classify to the second phase of the tournament. Pool A was played in June 2022 due to South Africa participation on the 2021 World Cup. The schedule for the other pools was announced by Rugby Africa on October 10, 2022

Pool Stage

Pool A

Pool B

Pool C

Pool D

References 

2022 in African rugby union
2022 in women's rugby union
Rugby Africa Women's Cup